New Weird America is a 21st century style of music that primarily draws on psychedelic and folk music of the 1960s and 1970s.

Etymology
The term was coined by David Keenan in the issue 234 (August 2003) of The Wire, following the Brattleboro Free Folk Festival organized by Matt Valentine and Ron J. Schneiderman. It is a play on Greil Marcus's phrase "Old Weird America" as described in his book Invisible Republic, which deals with the lineage connecting the pre-World War II folk performers on Harry Smith's Anthology of American Folk Music  to Bob Dylan and his milieu.

Free Folk
The Brattleboro Free Folk Festival was the summit gathering of the Free Folk scene that was largely centered in Massachusetts, Vermont, and Connecticut. The festival included Dredd Foole, Sunburned Hand of the Man, MV & EE, all members of Charalambides in different configurations, Jack Rose, Chris Corsano, Joshua, and Paul Flaherty –– most of whom operated out of the Pioneer Valley area. The scene drew on a wide range of musical influences, which Keenan summed up as "acoustic roots to drone, ritualistic performance, Krautrock, ecstatic jazz, hillbilly mountain music, psychedelia, archival blues and folk sides, Country funk and more." Adding, "ask any of these musicians where the initial energising spark for the New Weird America came from and they'll point you right back to Dredd Foole's epochal 1994 solo album, In Quest of Tense."

This largely underground scene, which also incorporated musicians from outside the region, including Six Organs of Admittance and Charalambides, was generally referred to as Free Folk, as named by Matt Valentine. Wrote Keenan:

Freak Folk
A higher profile collection of American musicians emerged at roughly the same time as Keenan's article. Almost entirely unconnected from the Free Folk scene and supporting labels, this far more visible and commercially successful wave is commonly referred to as Freak Folk. With influences more primarily centered on psychedelic rock and folk groups of the 1960s and 1970s, including American performers Holy Modal Rounders and English and Scottish groups, such as Pentangle, Incredible String Band, Donovan and Comus, this wave was spearheaded by Devendra Banhart, Joanna Newsom, and Vetiver. Both scenes were widely referred to in the music press as "New Weird America."

References

 
American folk music
Psychedelic music
Psychedelic folk musicians
Freak folk
American rock music genres
American styles of music